Harry Allen (born 25 March 1996) is an English cricketer. He made his first-class debut on 1 April 2018 for Cardiff MCCU against Gloucestershire as part of the Marylebone Cricket Club University fixtures.

References

External links
 

1996 births
Living people
English cricketers
Cardiff MCCU cricketers